The Apple Wassail is a traditional form of wassailing practiced in the cider orchards of southern England during the winter. There are many well recorded instances of the Apple Wassail in the early modern period.  The first recorded mention was at Fordwich, Kent, in 1585, by which time groups of young men would go between orchards performing the rite for a reward. The practice was sometimes referred to as "howling". On Twelfth Night, men would go with their wassail bowl into the orchard and go about the trees. Slices of bread or toast were laid at the roots and sometimes tied to branches. Cider was also poured over the tree roots. The ceremony is said to "bless" the trees to produce a good crop in the forthcoming season. Among the most famous wassail ceremonies are those in Whimple, Devon and Carhampton, Somerset, both on 17 January. 

There are also many new, commercial or "revival" wassails springing up all over the Westcountry. and further afield, such as those in Stoke Gabriel and Sandford, Devon. Clevedon in north Somerset holds an annual Wassailing event in the Clevedon Community Orchard, combining the traditional elements of the festival with the entertainment and music of the Bristol Morris Men and their Horse. The Blackhand Cyder Society in the village of Denton, Norfolk has developed its own version with a local maiden performing the blessing.

A folktale from Somerset reflecting this custom tells of the Apple Tree Man, the spirit of the oldest apple tree in an orchard, and in whom the fertility of the orchard is thought to reside. In the tale a man offers his last mug of mulled cider to the trees in his orchard and is rewarded by the Apple Tree Man who reveals to him the location of buried gold.

Traditional Apple Wassail rhymes

Henry David Thoreau also describes the tradition in "Wild Apples."

See also 
 Apple Day
 Wassail
 Wassailing
 Wish Tree

References

External links 
 
 The Stations of the Sun by Ronald Hutton
 Christmas Carols New and Old by Henry Ramsden Bramley and John Stainer (London: Novello, Ewer & Co., 1871)
 Apple Wassail Songs

English traditions
Apple festivals
Christmas traditions